Washington Park Zoo is a zoo in Michigan City, Indiana.

Washington Park Zoo is also the former name of:
Oregon Zoo, in Portland, Oregon
Milwaukee County Zoo, in Milwaukee, Wisconsin